Carobel is a small town in the northern Anseba Region of Eritrea. It was served by a station on the Eritrean Railway. However, the line closed in the 1970s.

See also
Railway stations in Eritrea

Notes

References
Carobel, Eritrea

Populated places in Eritrea